Humane Heritage Museum is located in Jeddah, Saudi Arabia. The museum displays many historical pieces from different ancient periods. Such pieces include, cutlery, outfits and weapons. Moreover, a great amount of manuscripts and books can be found.

See also

 List of museums in Saudi Arabia

References

Museums with year of establishment missing
History museums in Saudi Arabia
Museums in Jeddah